Cork Airport is the second-largest of the three principal international airports in Ireland, after Dublin and ahead of Shannon. In 2018, Cork Airport handled 2.39 million passengers, growing by over 8% to 2.58 million in 2019. Following a decline during the COVID-19 global pandemic, which saw passenger numbers fall to 530,000 in 2020, numbers in 2022 rose to 2.24 million.

Cork is the state's second-busiest airport in terms of passenger numbers, after Dublin, and third busiest on the island of Ireland, after Dublin and Belfast International.

History

1957 to 1980
In 1957 the Government of Ireland agreed in principle to the building of an airport for Cork. After considering many sites in the area, it was agreed that the airport should be built at Ballygarvan. Tenders were invited for the construction of the airport in 1959 at an estimated cost of £1 million. The airport was officially opened on 16 October 1961, following proving flights four days earlier by Aer Lingus and Cambrian Airways. Vincent Fanning was the first manager at the airport. In its first year the airport handled 10,172 passengers – close to the average number of passengers handled each day at the airport in 2007. Throughout the 1960s the airport expanded with the arrival of more advanced aircraft and more destinations. The first jet, a British Overseas Airways Corporation Comet, landed at Cork Airport on 29 March 1964. By 1969 Aer Lingus was operating to London Heathrow, Manchester and Bristol.

In 1975 Aer Rianta, the then state airports authority, undertook a passenger terminal study aimed at improving the terminal facilities. The findings resulted in the provision, over the next two years, of new departure and arrival halls, a new check-in area, office complex, information desk, duty office and executive lounge. The new extensions and facilities were opened in 1978.

1980 to 2000
The 1980s began with an extension of the main apron. New services to London Gatwick began, while Aer Lingus' commuter division started a new domestic service to Dublin Airport. In 1985 following significant growth, Aer Rianta carried out a survey of the terminal facilities with a view to carrying out a major expansion and development programme. On 8 June 1987, Ryanair commenced services at Cork Airport. The following year, Phase I of the Terminal Expansion and Development Plan was completed.

The 1990s began with the completion of Phase II of the terminal expansion in 1991 and Phase III being completed in 1992 with the plan being brought to completion in 1994.

2000 to 2010
A Great Southern Hotel was opened on the airport grounds during 2001 and plans were drawn up for the construction of a new terminal building and ancillary capital investment works at an estimated cost of €140 million. Also towards the end of 2001, new Irish regional airline Aer Arann opened its second base at Cork opening new routes to/from the airport.

Along with the construction of the terminal, roads were upgraded from single to dual carriageway and re-aligned, and a new short term multi-storey car park was constructed. Airbridges were included in the original terminal design, however only one airbridge was built because airline representatives from the low-cost carriers who use Cork Airport made it clear that they did not want airbridges, would not use them and would not pay for them. In the circumstances, the DAA removed the airbridges from the terminal design during construction of the new facility. The new terminal was completed with four fixed links to the main building, and was designed to accommodate additional airbridges in future or if needed.

In 2005, Ryanair opened its 15th European base and second Irish base at Cork. The following year, the new terminal opened on 15 August 2006. Designed by HOK and Jacobs Engineering Group, the new terminal was the first built in Ireland in the 21st century.

In April 2008, the board of Cork Airport Authority agreed by one vote to accept responsibility for a debt of €113 million incurred by the Dublin Airport Authority in the redevelopment of Cork Airport to secure independence from Dublin Airport. This was despite government commitments that the Cork Airport Authority would be established on a debt-free basis. The Cork Airport Authority Board also stated that their strong reservations about the level of debt that Cork Airport was being levied with and the potential impact on its future sustainability. In late April 2008, Cork Airport Authority chairman, Joe Gantly, announced his resignation effective from the end of July 2008. Gerry Walsh replaced Gantly as chairman.

The Irish Aviation Authority completed a new control tower 1 km from the old terminal to the west of the main runway.
The total cost was €7.5 million and was funded entirely by the IAA with no government funding. Construction began in August 2007 and was completed in June 2008 but it took until mid October 2009 to get all the new systems tested and working. The new control tower officially opened on 20 October 2009 at 00:01.

2010 to present

On 22 May 2011, at around 4:30pm a man entered a Garda Síochána vehicle in Cork City Centre and slashed the Garda in the vehicle with a knife. The Garda jumped from his vehicle and the man hijacked it, hitting a number of vehicles while driving to Cork Airport. At approximately 4:50pm the vehicle rammed through a perimeter airport fence, before breaking down. The man abandoned the Garda vehicle and, again producing a knife, hijacked an Airport Fire Service vehicle. By this time Air Traffic Control had suspended all operations. The man drove erratically on the airport taxiway, driving underneath a stationary Thomas Cook aircraft at high speed. The man proceeded to ram several Garda and airport vehicles, before attempting to ram an Aer Lingus aircraft. The hijacked vehicle stalled, halting feet from the Airbus A320. Armed Gardaí subdued the man with a taser. Flights were resumed after the man was removed and the airport perimeter secured.

On 16 October 2011, Cork Airport celebrated its 50th anniversary.

In 2013, Cork Airport was placed first for overall customer satisfaction in a global survey of passengers carried out by Airports Council International. The survey measured customer satisfaction across eight categories in 61 regional airports worldwide, with Cork Airport scoring highest.

In 2014, the Airport met its public sector obligation of a 33% reduction in energy costs, 6 years earlier than their 2020 target, and were awarded first place in the public sector category at the Sustainable Energy Awards 2014.

In 2016, Cork Airport won the Corporate Campaign of the Year Prize at the EU Public Affairs Awards (EuroPAwards) in Brussels, primarily for its efforts to secure a direct transatlantic route. Also in 2016, Cork Airport became the first Irish airport to launch a no drone zone within 5 km of the airfield. The campaign was launched following a number of incidents involving drones or aircraft on approach or departure from aerodromes throughout Europe. Despite this campaign, at least two drones encroached airspace during April 2017.

The airport was named as "Best Airport in Europe under 5 million passengers" at the Airports Council International (ACI) Europe General Assembly in both 2017 and 2019.

Geographical situation
The Instrument landing system has been upgraded to Category II, and together with a  extension of the main runway has significantly reduced the number of diversions. However, during times of severe inclement weather the airport can suffer from delays or diversions to airports such as Shannon, Dublin or Kerry. Similarly, diversions from these airports occasionally land at Cork.

The length of the main runway dictates that the airport cannot handle fully laden large widebody aircraft. Large wide-bodied aircraft do visit Cork Airport on an irregular basis, for example to operate ad-hoc charter services for flights to sporting events such as those of the Munster Rugby team.

Operator
From its opening in 1961, the airport was managed by the Department of Transport and Power, now the Department of Transport. Aer Rianta took control of Cork and Shannon Airports on 1 April 1969 and the assets of the airports were transferred to the company under the Air Navigation and Transport (Amendment) Act, 1998.  The name of Aer Rianta was changed to the Dublin Airport Authority (DAA) under the State Airports Act 2004, which also created the Cork Airport Authority and the Shannon Airport Authority. These companies were charged with preparing a business plan in preparation for taking over the assets of their airports from the DAA.

Cork Airport is responsible for the infrastructure which enables airlines and handling agents at the airport. Aer Lingus provide their own aircraft ground handling services, while other airlines and private flights contract services to third party ground handlers (Swissport and Weston Aviation).

Passenger facilities
The main terminal at Cork Airport contains several shopping and eating facilities both before and after the security screening area, a bureau de change kiosk and ATM (cash machine) and a business lounge operated by Swissport. There are eight departure gates in the airport, two of which have an airbridge. Wi-Fi is available throughout the terminal.

There are two hotels located adjacent to the passenger terminal, the Cork International Hotel which is located in the business park, and the Cork Airport Hotel (previously branded Park Inn by Radisson) which is located opposite the terminal on airport grounds.

Development plans
In 2013 Cork Airport completed a Master Plan for the overall development of the airport until 2023.

This plan envisages that the cargo area, currently located to the north–east of the airport, would be moved to the south–east of the grounds, with the general aviation area transferred opposite the main runway at the south–west of airport. Using space from the removal of the cargo area, the main terminal could be extended northwards, potentially doubling the space for aircraft. The plan also calls for the old terminal to be demolished.

Parallel plans for transport infrastructure also exist, including upgrading the N27 to two lanes in each direction and a dedicated bus lane for city–bound traffic. The roundabout at the entrance of the airport would be enhanced with an under-pass.

In February 2017 it was announced that €4 million was to be invested at the airport for training, screening and restaurant facilities, with the existing restaurant moving from landside to airside.

In November 2020 it was announced that Cork Airport was bringing forward its plans to rebuild and refurbish its main runway from Q4 2022/Q1 2023 to Q3 2021 as a result of the COVID-19 pandemic and the impact on its traffic.

Airlines and destinations

The following airlines operate regularly scheduled and chartered flights from Cork Airport:

Statistics

Passenger numbers
Passenger numbers at Cork Airport increased every year during the ten years between 1998 and 2008 by an average of 14.8% per annum from around 1.3 million to over 3.2 million. Passenger numbers fell however during the subsequent seven years to just below 2.1 million in 2015. Passenger numbers returned to growth in 2016, with a year-on-year increase of 7.7% to 2.23 million passengers. In 2017 this number rose to 2.3 million, increasing during 2018 by a further 4% to around 2.4 million passengers. By 2019 it had increased to 2.6 million after which it suffered a drop due to the COVID-19 pandemic, along with most "other airports [..] across the world".

Busiest routes

General aviation and business jets
Cork Airport has a number of services supporting general aviation flying, and also serves business jets. Both fixed wing and rotary wing flight training providers operate at the airport, with flying schools located to the south of the terminal building, on the east side of the main runway.

Business park
A  business park was developed at the airport from October 1998. , there were in excess of 50 tenant companies in the business park, including Amazon, IBM, BNY Mellon, Logitech, Nuix, McKesson and Aviva.

Ground transport

Bus
Bus Éireann serve the airport on route number 225 (from Kent Rail Station to Haulbowline) and route 226 (Kent Rail Station to Kinsale). Irish Citylink also operate coach services to the airport from Galway via Limerick:

Taxi
The airport is served by taxi, with a taxi rank outside the arrivals entrance.

Rail
There is no rail link to the airport, and the nearest station is Kent Station on the edge of the city centre. There are multiple Bus Éireann routes connecting the airport to Kent Station via the city centre.

Car
It is connected to the city centre via the N27 and N40. The R600 connects the airport to the port town of Kinsale, which forms part of the Wild Atlantic Way tourist route. DAA operates all car parks at the airport, with both short-term and long-term parking within the campus and over 4,600 spaces in total. A number of companies offer car-hire in the arrivals hall of the terminal building.

Accidents and incidents
On 10 February 2011, a Fairchild SA 227-BC Metro III owned by the Spanish airline Air Lada registered EC-ITP, was operating a scheduled flight under the AOC of Flightline S.L for the ticket seller Manx2. The flight NM7100 was operating from Belfast-City to Cork with ten passengers and two crew. At 09:50 hrs during the third attempt to land at Cork Airport in low visibility conditions, control was lost and the aircraft impacted the runway. The aircraft came to a rest inverted in soft ground to the right of the runway surface. Post impact fires occurred in both engines which were quickly extinguished by the Airport Fire Service (AFS). Six persons, including both pilots, were fatally injured. Four passengers were seriously injured and two received minor injuries.

References

External links

 Official website
 
 
 

1961 establishments in Ireland
Airports established in 1961
Airports in the Republic of Ireland
Buildings and structures in County Cork
Transport in Cork (city)